Dufferin—Peel—Wellington—Grey was a federal electoral district in Ontario, Canada, that was represented in the House of Commons of Canada from 1997 to 2004.

Federal electoral district
The federal riding was created as a result of redistribution in 1996 from parts of Guelph—Wellington, Halton—Peel and Wellington—Grey—Dufferin—Simcoe ridings. Located west of Toronto, the largely rural electoral district's largest centre is the town of Orangeville, Ontario. The riding consisted of the entire County of Dufferin; that part of the County of Grey contained in the townships of Egremont and Proton and the Village of Dundalk; that part of the County of Wellington contained in the townships of Erin and West Luther, the Town of Mount Forest and the villages of Arthur and Erin and that part of the Regional Municipality of Peel contained in the Town of Caledon.

The riding's first vote was the 1997 federal election in which Liberal Murray Calder became its Member of Parliament. Calder was re-elected in the 2000 election.

The federal electoral district was abolished in 2003 when it was redistributed between Dufferin—Caledon, Grey—Bruce—Owen Sound, Perth—Wellington and Wellington—Halton Hills ridings.

Members of Parliament
The riding has elected the following Members of Parliament:

Election results

|}

|}

External links
Riding history from the Library of Parliament

Former federal electoral districts of Ontario
Orangeville, Ontario